Events in the year 1913 in Japan.

Incumbents
Emperor: Emperor Taishō
Prime Minister:
Katsura Tarō (until February 20)
Yamamoto Gonnohyōe (starting February 20)

Governors
Aichi Prefecture: Kenzo Ishihara (until 13 March); Matsui Shigeru (starting 13 March)
Akita Prefecture: Toyosuke Haneda
Aomori Prefecture: Takeda Chiyosaburo (until 1 June); Takeo Tanaka (starting 1 June)
Ehime Prefecture: Renarto Fukamachi
Fukui Prefecture: Tokiwa Ikematsu (until 1 June); Teru Kagawa (starting 1 June)
Fukushima Prefecture: Hiromichi Nishikubo (until 1 June); Ota Masahiro (starting 1 June)
Gifu Prefecture: Sadakichi Usu (until 1 June); Shimada Gotaro (starting 1 June)
Gunma Prefecture: Yasuyoshi Kurogane (until 1 June); Muneyoshi Oshiba (starting 1 June)
Hiroshima Prefecture: Nakamura Junkuro (until 27 February); Terada Yushi (starting 27 February)
Ibaraki Prefecture: Keisuke Sakanaka
Iwate Prefecture: Shinichi Kasai (until 3 March); Sadajiro Tsutsumi (starting 3 March)
Kagawa Prefecture: Kogoro Kanokogi
Kumamoto Prefecture: Ueyama Mitsunoshin (until 31 May); Akahoshi Futoshi (starting 31 May)
Kochi Prefecture: Goro Sugiyama (until 1 June); Kinjiro Nagai (starting 1 June)
Kyoto Prefecture: Shoichi Omori
Mie Prefecture: Magoichi Tahara
Miyagi Prefecture: Terada Yushi (until 27 February); Mori Masataka (starting 27 February)
Miyazaki Prefecture: Tadakazu Ariyoshi
Nagano Prefecture: Teikan Chiba (until 3 April); Ichiro Yoda (starting 3 April)
Nara Prefecture: Raizo Wakabayashi (until month unknown)
Niigata Prefecture: Izawa Takio (until 8 September); Ando Kensuke (starting 8 September)
Okayama Prefecture: Tsunamasa Ōyama (until month unknown)
Okinawa Prefecture: Hibi Shigeaki (until 1 June); Takuya Takahashi (starting 1 June)
Osaka Prefecture: Marques Okubo Toshi Takeshi
Saga Prefecture: Fuwa
Saitama Prefecture: Shimada Gotaro (until 1 June); Soeda Keiichiro (starting 1 June)
Shiname Prefecture: Takaoka Naokichi
Tochigi Prefecture: Okada Bunji
Tokyo: Munakata Tadash
Tottori Prefecture: Oka Kishichiro Itami (until month unknown)
Toyama Prefecture: Tsunenosuke Hamada
Yamagata Prefecture: Iwataro Odakiri

Events
January 21 – The first French private school opens in Tokyo. Later graduates include Sakaguchi Ango, Tanizaki Junichiro and Takehisa Yumeji.

Births
January 12 – Yoshi Katō, actor (d. 1988)
February 9 – Haruyo Ichikawa, film actress (d. 2004)
February 11 – Masaji Kiyokawa, backstroke swimmer (d. 1999)
March 28 – Toko Shinoda, painter (d. 2021)
April 12 – Keiko Fukuda, martial artist (d. 2013)
May 14 – Masaji Iguro, ski jumper (d. 2000)
June 24 – Takeshi Nagata, earth scientist, (d. 1991)
July 4 – Princess Ayako Takeda (d. 2003)
September 4 – Kenzō Tange, architect (d. 2005)
September 12 – Eiji Toyoda, industrialist (d. 2013)
October 21 – Princess Sawako Kitashirakawa, daughter of Prince Naruhisa Kitashirakawa (d. 2001)
October 26 – Sakunosuke Oda, writer (d. 1947)
November 5 – Seiji Miyaguchi, actor (d. 1985)
December 15 – Masayoshi Ito, politician (d. 1994)

Deaths
January 20 – Nakane Kōtei, writer (b. 1839)
June 23 – Ogino Ginko, first licensed female physician of western medicine in Japan (b. 1851)
July 5 – Prince Arisugawa Takehito, Marshal Admiral (b. 1862)
July 10 – Hayashi Tadasu, diplomat and cabinet minister (b. 1850)
July 30 – Itō Sachio, writer and poet (b. 1864)
September 2 – Okakura Kakuzō, scholar (b. 1862)
September 4 – Shōzō Tanaka, social activist (b. 1841)
October 10 – Katsura Tarō, general and Prime Minister of Japan (b. 1848)
November 22 – Tokugawa Yoshinobu, 15th and last Tokugawa shogunate (b. 1837)
Ichikawa Kumehachi, kabuki actress (b. 1846)

References

 
1910s in Japan
Japan
Years of the 20th century in Japan